Francisco Cerúndolo was the defending champion but chose not to defend his title.

Blaž Rola won the title after defeating Blaž Kavčič 2–6, 6–3, 6–2 in the final.

Seeds

Draw

Finals

Top half

Bottom half

References

External links
Main draw
Qualifying draw

Split Open - 1
Split Open